North Ward School  may refer to:

 North Ward School (Bolivar, Missouri)
 North Ward School (Paris, Ontario)